Malcolm Timothy Gladwell  (born 3 September 1963) is an English-born Canadian journalist, author, and public speaker. He has been a staff writer for The New Yorker since 1996. He has published seven books: The Tipping Point: How Little Things Can Make a Big Difference (2000); Blink: The Power of Thinking Without Thinking (2005); Outliers: The Story of Success (2008); What the Dog Saw: And Other Adventures (2009), a collection of his journalism; David and Goliath: Underdogs, Misfits, and the Art of Battling Giants (2013); Talking To Strangers: What We Should Know about the People We Don't Know (2019) and The Bomber Mafia: A Dream, a Temptation, and the Longest Night of the Second World War (2021). His first five books were on The New York Times Best Seller list. He is also the host of the podcast Revisionist History and co-founder of the podcast company Pushkin Industries.

Gladwell's writings often deal with the unexpected implications of research in the social sciences, like sociology and psychology, and make frequent and extended use of academic work. Gladwell was appointed to the Order of Canada in 2011.

Early life
Gladwell was born in Fareham, Hampshire, England. His mother is Joyce (née Nation) Gladwell, a Jamaican psychotherapist. His father, Graham Gladwell, was a mathematics professor from Kent, England. When he was six his family moved from Southampton to the Mennonite community of Elmira, Ontario, Canada. He has two brothers. Throughout his childhood, Malcolm lived in rural Ontario Mennonite country, where he attended a Mennonite church. Research done by historian Henry Louis Gates Jr. revealed that one of Gladwell's maternal ancestors was a Jamaican free woman of colour (mixed black and white) who was a slaveowner. His great-great-great-grandmother was of Igbo ethnicity from Nigeria, West Africa.
In the epilogue of his book Outliers he describes many lucky circumstances that came to his family over the course of several generations, contributing to his path towards success. Gladwell has said that his mother is his role model as a writer. 

Gladwell's father noted Malcolm was an unusually single-minded and ambitious boy. When Malcolm was 11, his father, who was a professor of mathematics and engineering at the University of Waterloo, allowed him to wander around the offices at his university, which stoked the boy's interest in reading and libraries. The University of Waterloo granted Gladwell an honorary doctorate in 2007. In the spring of 1982, Gladwell interned with the National Journalism Center in Washington, D.C. He graduated with a bachelor's degree in history from Trinity College of the University of Toronto, in 1984.

Career 
Gladwell's grades were not high enough for graduate school, so he decided to pursue advertising as a career. After being rejected by every advertising agency he applied to, he accepted a journalism position at conservative magazine The American Spectator and moved to Indiana. He subsequently wrote for Insight on the News, a conservative magazine owned by Sun Myung Moon's Unification Church. In 1987, Gladwell began covering business and science for The Washington Post, where he worked until 1996. In a personal elucidation of the 10,000-hour rule he popularized in Outliers, Gladwell notes, "I was a basket case at the beginning, and I felt like an expert at the end. It took 10 years—exactly that long."

When Gladwell started at The New Yorker in 1996 he wanted to "mine current academic research for insights, theories, direction, or inspiration". His first assignment was to write a piece about fashion. Instead of writing about high-class fashion, Gladwell opted to write a piece about a man who manufactured T-shirts, saying: "[I]t was much more interesting to write a piece about someone who made a T-shirt for $8 than it was to write about a dress that costs $100,000. I mean, you or I could make a dress for $100,000, but to make a T-shirt for $8—that's much tougher."

Gladwell gained popularity with two New Yorker articles, both written in 1996: "The Tipping Point" and "The Coolhunt". These two pieces would become the basis for Gladwell's first book, The Tipping Point, for which he received a $1 million advance. He continues to write for The New Yorker. Gladwell also served as a contributing editor for Grantland, a sports journalism website founded by former ESPN columnist Bill Simmons.

In a July 2002 article in The New Yorker, Gladwell introduced the concept of the "talent myth" that companies and organizations, in his view, incorrectly follow. This work examines different managerial and administrative techniques that companies, both winners and losers, have used. He states that the misconception seems to be that management and executives are all too ready to classify employees without ample performance records and thus make hasty decisions. Many companies believe in disproportionately rewarding "stars" over other employees with bonuses and promotions. However, with the quick rise of inexperienced workers with little in-depth performance review, promotions are often incorrectly made, putting employees into positions they should not have and keeping other, more experienced employees from rising. He also points out that under this system, narcissistic personality types are more likely to climb the ladder, since they are more likely to take more credit for achievements and take less blame for failure. He states both that narcissists make the worst managers and that the system of rewarding "stars" eventually worsens a company's position. Gladwell states that the most successful long-term companies are those who reward experience above all else and require greater time for promotions.

Works 
With the release of The Bomber Mafia: A Dream, a Temptation, and the Longest Night of the Second World War in April 2021, Gladwell has had seven books published. When asked for the process behind his writing, he said: "I have two parallel things I'm interested in. One is, I'm interested in collecting interesting stories, and the other is I'm interested in collecting interesting research. What I'm looking for is cases where they overlap".

The Tipping Point

The initial inspiration for his first book, The Tipping Point, which was published in 2000, came from the sudden drop of crime in New York City. He wanted the book to have a broader appeal than just crime, however, and sought to explain similar phenomena through the lens of epidemiology. While Gladwell was a reporter for The Washington Post, he covered the AIDS epidemic. He began to take note of "how strange epidemics were", saying epidemiologists have a "strikingly different way of looking at the world". The term "tipping point" comes from the moment in an epidemic when the virus reaches critical mass and begins to spread at a much higher rate.

Gladwell's theories of crime were heavily influenced by the "broken windows theory" of policing, and Gladwell is credited for packaging and popularizing the theory in a way that was implementable in New York City. Gladwell's theoretical implementation bears a striking resemblance to the "stop-and-frisk" policies of the NYPD. However, in the decade and a half since its publication, The Tipping Point and Gladwell have both come under fire for the tenuous link between "broken windows" and New York City's drop in violent crime. During a 2013 interview with BBC journalist Jon Ronson for The Culture Show, Gladwell admitted that he was "too in love with the broken-windows notion". He went on to say that he was "so enamored by the metaphorical simplicity of that idea that I overstated its importance".

Blink

After The Tipping Point, Gladwell published Blink in 2005. The book explains how the human unconscious interprets events or cues as well as how past experiences can lead people to make informed decisions very rapidly. Gladwell uses examples like the Getty kouros and psychologist John Gottman's research on the likelihood of divorce in married couples. Gladwell's hair was the inspiration for Blink. He stated that once he allowed his hair to get longer, he started to get speeding tickets all the time, an oddity considering that he had never gotten one before and that he started getting pulled out of airport security lines for special attention. In a particular incident, he was apprehended by three police officers while walking in downtown Manhattan because his curly hair matched the profile of a rapist, despite the fact the suspect looked nothing like him otherwise.

Gladwell's The Tipping Point (2000) and Blink (2005) were international bestsellers. The Tipping Point sold more than two million copies in the United States. Blink sold equally well. As of November 2008, the two books had sold a combined 4.5 million copies.

Outliers

Gladwell's third book, Outliers, published in 2008, examines how a person's environment, in conjunction with personal drive and motivation, affects his or her possibility and opportunity for success. Gladwell's original question revolved around lawyers: "We take it for granted that there's this guy in New York who's the corporate lawyer, right? I just was curious: Why is it all the same guy?", referring to the fact that "a surprising number of the most powerful and successful corporate lawyers in New York City have almost the exact same biography". In another example given in the book, Gladwell noticed that people ascribe Bill Gates's success to being "really smart" or "really ambitious". He noted that he knew a lot of people who are really smart and really ambitious, but not worth $60 billion. "It struck me that our understanding of success was really crude—and there was an opportunity to dig down and come up with a better set of explanations."

What the Dog Saw

Gladwell's fourth book, What the Dog Saw: And Other Adventures, was published in 2009. What the Dog Saw bundles together Gladwell's favourites of his articles from The New Yorker since he joined the magazine as a staff writer in 1996. The stories share a common theme, namely that Gladwell tries to show us the world through the eyes of others, even if that other happens to be a dog.

David and Goliath

Gladwell's fifth book, David and Goliath, was released in October 2013, and examines the struggle of underdogs versus favourites. The book is partially inspired by an article Gladwell wrote for The New Yorker in 2009 entitled "How David Beats Goliath". The book was a bestseller but received mixed reviews.

Talking to Strangers

Gladwell's sixth book, Talking to Strangers, was released September 2019. The book examines interactions with strangers, covers examples that include the deceptions of Bernie Madoff, the trial of Amanda Knox, the suicide of Sylvia Plath, the Jerry Sandusky pedophilia case at Penn State, and the death of Sandra Bland. Gladwell explained what inspired him to write the book as being "struck by how many high profile cases in the news were about the same thing—strangers misunderstanding each other." It challenges the assumptions we are programmed to make when encountering strangers, and the potentially dangerous consequences of misreading people we do not know.

The Bomber Mafia

Gladwell's seventh book, The Bomber Mafia: A Dream, a Temptation, and the Longest Night of the Second World War, was released in April 2021. The book weaves together the stories of a Dutch genius and his homemade computer, a band of brothers in central Alabama, a British psychopath, and pyromaniacal chemists at Harvard to examine one of the greatest moral challenges in modern American history.

Reception
The Tipping Point was named as one of the best books of the decade by The A.V. Club, The Guardian, and The Times.</ref> It was also Barnes & Noble's fifth-best-selling non-fiction book of the decade. Blink was named to Fast Company list of the best business books of 2005. It was also number 5 on Amazon customers' favourite books of 2005, named to The Christian Science Monitor best non-fiction books of 2005, and in the top 50 of Amazon customers' favourite books of the decade. Outliers was a number 1 New York Times bestseller for 11 straight weeks and was Time's number 10 non-fiction book of 2008 as well as named to the San Francisco Chronicle list of the 50 best non-fiction books of 2008.

Fortune described The Tipping Point as "a fascinating book that makes you see the world in a different way". The Daily Telegraph called it "a wonderfully offbeat study of that little-understood phenomenon, the social epidemic".

Reviewing Blink, The Baltimore Sun dubbed Gladwell "the most original American journalist since the young Tom Wolfe." Farhad Manjoo at Salon described the book as "a real pleasure. As in the best of Gladwell's work, Blink brims with surprising insights about our world and ourselves." The Economist called Outliers "a compelling read with an important message". David Leonhardt wrote in The New York Times Book Review: "In the vast world of nonfiction writing, Malcolm Gladwell is as close to a singular talent as exists today" and Outliers "leaves you mulling over its inventive theories for days afterward". Ian Sample wrote in The Guardian: "Brought together, the pieces form a dazzling record of Gladwell's art. There is depth to his research and clarity in his arguments, but it is the breadth of subjects he applies himself to that is truly impressive."

Gladwell's critics have described him as prone to oversimplification. The New Republic called the final chapter of Outliers, "impervious to all forms of critical thinking" and said Gladwell believes "a perfect anecdote proves a fatuous rule". Gladwell has also been criticized for his emphasis on anecdotal evidence over research to support his conclusions. Maureen Tkacik and Steven Pinker have challenged the integrity of Gladwell's approach. Even while praising Gladwell's writing style and content, Pinker summed up Gladwell as "a minor genius who unwittingly demonstrates the hazards of statistical reasoning", while accusing him of "cherry-picked anecdotes, post-hoc sophistry and false dichotomies" in his book Outliers. Referencing a Gladwell reporting mistake in which Gladwell refers to "eigenvalue" as "Igon Value", Pinker criticizes his lack of expertise: "I will call this the Igon Value Problem: when a writer's education on a topic consists in interviewing an expert, he is apt to offer generalizations that are banal, obtuse or flat wrong." A writer in The Independent accused Gladwell of posing "obvious" insights. The Register has accused Gladwell of making arguments by weak analogy and commented Gladwell has an "aversion for fact", adding: "Gladwell has made a career out of handing simple, vacuous truths to people and dressing them up with flowery language and an impressionistic take on the scientific method." In that regard, The New Republic has called him "America's Best-Paid Fairy-Tale Writer". His approach was satirized by the online site "The Malcolm Gladwell Book Generator".

In 2005, Gladwell commanded a $45,000 speaking fee. In 2008, he was making "about 30 speeches a year—most for tens of thousands of dollars, some for free", according to a profile in New York magazine. In 2011, he gave three talks to groups of small businessmen as part of a three-city speaking tour put on by Bank of America. The program was titled "Bank of America Small Business Speaker Series: A Conversation with Malcolm Gladwell". Paul Starobin, writing in the Columbia Journalism Review, said the engagement's "entire point seemed to be to forge a public link between a tarnished brand (the bank), and a winning one (a journalist often described in profiles as the epitome of cool)". An article by Melissa Bell of The Washington Post posed the question: "Malcolm Gladwell: Bank of America's new spokesman?" Mother Jones editor Clara Jeffery said Gladwell's job for Bank of America had "terrible ethical optics". However, Gladwell says he was unaware that Bank of America was "bragging about his speaking engagements" until the Atlantic Wire emailed him. Gladwell explained:

In 2012, CBS's 60 Minutes attributed the trend of American parents "redshirting" their five-year-olds (postponing entrance into kindergarten to give them an advantage) to a section in Gladwell's Outliers.

Sociology professor Shayne Lee referenced Outliers in a CNN editorial commemorating Martin Luther King Jr.'s birthday. Lee discussed the strategic timing of King's ascent from a "Gladwellian perspective". Gladwell gives credit to Richard Nisbett and Lee Ross for inventing the Gladwellian genre.

Gladwell has provided blurbs for "scores of book covers", leading The New York Times to ask, "Is it possible that Mr. Gladwell has been spreading the love a bit too thinly?" Gladwell, who said he did not know how many blurbs he had written, acknowledged, "The more blurbs you give, the lower the value of the blurb. It's the tragedy of the commons."

Podcast
Gladwell is host of the podcast Revisionist History, initially produced through Panoply Media and now through Gladwell's own podcast company. It began in 2016, and has aired five 10-episode seasons. Each episode begins with an inquiry about a person, event, or idea, and proceeds to question the received wisdom about the subject. Gladwell was recruited to create a podcast by Jacob Weisberg, editor-in-chief of The Slate Group, which also includes the podcast network Panoply Media. In September 2018, Gladwell announced he was co-founding a podcast company, later named Pushkin Industries, with Weisberg. About this decision, Gladwell told the Los Angeles Times: "There is a certain kind of whimsy and emotionality that can only be captured on audio."

He also has a music podcast with Bruce Headlam and Rick Rubin, titled Broken Record where they interview musicians. It has two seasons, 2018–2019 and 2020 with a total of 49 episodes.

Personal life
Gladwell is a Christian. His family attended Above Bar Church in Southampton, UK, and later Gale Presbyterian in Elmira when they moved to Canada. His parents and siblings are part of the Mennonite community in Southwestern Ontario. Gladwell wandered away from his Christian roots when he moved to New York, only to rediscover his faith during the writing of David and Goliath and his encounter with Wilma Derksen regarding the death of her child. 

Gladwell was a national class runner and an Ontario High School (Ontario Federation of School Athletic Associations – OFSAA) champion. He was among Canada's fastest teenagers at 1500 metres, running 4:14 at the age of 13 and 4:05 when aged 14. At university, Gladwell ran 1500 metres in 3:55. In 2014, at the age of 51, he ran a 4:54 at the Fifth Avenue Mile. At 57 he ran a 5:15 mile.

He had his first child, a daughter, in 2022.

Awards and honours
 2005 – Time named Gladwell one of its 100 most influential people
 2007 – American Sociological Association's first Award for Excellence in the Reporting of Social Issues
 2007 – honorary degree from University of Waterloo
 2011 – honorary degree from University of Toronto
2011 – Order of Canada, the second highest honour for merit in the system of orders, decorations, and medals of Canada

Bibliography

Books

Audiobooks
 Miracle and Wonder: Conversations with Paul Simon
 I Hate the Ivy League: Riffs and Rants on Elite Education

Essays and reporting
 
 
 
 
 
 
 
 
  Includes review of

Podcasts

Book reviews

Filmography
 The Missionary (2013, TV movie)

Other appearances
Gladwell was a featured storyteller for the Moth podcast. He told a story about a well-intentioned wedding toast for a young man and his friends that went wrong.
Gladwell was featured in General Motors "EVerybody in." campaign.

Gladwell is the only guest to have been featured as a headliner at every OZY Fest festival—an annual music and ideas festival produced by OZY Media—other than OZY co-founder and CEO Carlos Watson. Gladwell has also appeared on several television shows for OZY Media, including the Carlos Watson Show (YouTube) and Third Rail With OZY (PBS).

Gladwell has a chapter giving advice in Tim Ferriss's book Tools of Titans.

Gladwell was voiced by Colton Dunn in Solar Opposites S3.E1 The Extremity Triangulator.

References

External links 

 
 
 
Revisionist History podcast
 
 Articles and Essays by Malcolm Gladwell

1963 births
20th-century Canadian non-fiction writers
20th-century Canadian male writers
21st-century Canadian male writers
Black Canadian writers
English emigrants to Canada
English people of Jamaican descent
Business speakers
Canadian people of Jamaican descent
Canadian male screenwriters
Members of the Order of Canada
Canadian social sciences writers
The American Spectator people
The New Yorker people
The New Yorker staff writers
The Washington Post people
Trinity College (Canada) alumni
University of Toronto alumni
People from Fareham
Living people
Canadian Christians
Canadian Mennonites
Mennonite writers
Canadian male non-fiction writers
21st-century Canadian screenwriters